Chen Yuan (born in January 1945) is a Chinese economist who is the current chairman of the China Association for International Friendly Contact (CAIFC). He previously as the chairman of the China Development Bank from March 1998 to April 2013. Chen Yuan then served as Vice Chairman of the National Committee of the Chinese People's Political Consultative Conference from 2013 to 2018. He is the eldest son of former Vice Premier Chen Yun.

Biography
Chen Yuan graduated with a master's degree in Industrial Economics from the Graduate School of Chinese Academy of Social Sciences, where he studied under the supervision of economists Yu Guangyuan and Ma Hong. He was appointed secretary of the Xicheng District Committee of the Beijing Municipal Committee of the Chinese Communist Party (CCP) and director-general of the Beijing Municipal Commerce and Trade Department in August 1982.

He assumed the post of deputy secretary of the leading party members' group and vice governor of the People's Bank of China in March 1988. Chen's leadership at the People's Bank of China was noteworthy. It was a time when China was just opening up trading with the West. Prior to 1988 when Chen joined PBOC, there were almost no international reserves. However, by 1992, as trade increased, the foreign reserves also started to grow as a result of the international trade to over US$10 billion. Thus, Chen was charged with helping to turn the People's Bank of China into a modern central bank. As one of the key things he did, he brought in outside advisors such as William Lawton, a noted fixed income and currency expert who was a Senior Vice President in charge of global fixed income at Trust Company of the West, a well known international asset management company headquartered in Los Angeles. Chen oversaw the implementation under Lawton's supervision of risk guidelines for the Bank, utilization of research models such as the Lawton Bond Model, and upgrading of the computer and trading systems.  It was under Chen's leadership and foresight that PBOC was put on a firm footing to become the world's largest central bank in a little over a decade.

He has been the Chairman of the China Finance 40 Forum (CF40) since its founding in 2008.

References

External links
Chen Yuan at chinavitae.com

People's Republic of China economists
Living people
Chen Yun family
People's Republic of China politicians from Shanghai
Chinese Communist Party politicians from Shanghai
Members of the Preparatory Committee for the Hong Kong Special Administrative Region
Beijing No. 4 High School alumni
China Development Bank people
1945 births
Economists from Shanghai
Vice Chairpersons of the National Committee of the Chinese People's Political Consultative Conference